The 1981 Finnish motorcycle Grand Prix was the twelfth round of the 1981 Grand Prix motorcycle racing season. It took place on the weekend of 7–9 August 1981 at the Imatra Circuit.

Classification

500 cc

References

Finnish motorcycle Grand Prix
Motorcycle Grand Prix
Finnish
Finnish motorcycle Grand Prix